The 2021 Los Angeles Gladiators season will be the fourth season of Los Angeles Gladiators's existence in the Overwatch League and their fourth season under head coach David "dpei" Pei.

Preceding offseason

Roster changes 
The Gladiators entered free agency with six free agents, four of which became free agents due to the Gladiators not exercising the option to retain the player for another year.

Acquisitions 
The Gladiators' first offseason acquisition was Kim "MuZe" Young-hun, a rookie tank player that competed with Paris Eternal Overwatch Contenders academy team Eternal Academy the previous season, who was signed on November 8, 2020. The next day, they signed Kim "Shu" Jin-seo, a support player that was a "strong presence at the flex support position" with the Guangzhou Charge for the previous two seasons. The Gladiators bolstered their support position on November 12 with the signing of Grant "Moth" Espe, a support player coming off back-to-back Overwatch League championships with the San Francisco Shock and who is considered as one of the best main support players in the world. The team's final acquisition of the offseason was Kim "Skewed" Min-seok, a rookie flex support player from Overwatch Contenders Korea team OZ Gaming who was signed on December 4.

Departures 
None of the Gladiators' free agents returned, two of which signed with other teams, beginning with tank player Son "OGE" Min-seok signing with the Florida Mayhem on December 11, 2020. Tank player Roni "LHCloudy" Tiihonen signed with Overwatch Contenders team Revival on March 11. Three of the Gladiators free agents announced their retirements in the offseason: damage player Jason "Jaru" White, support player Benjamin "BigGoose" Isohanni, and support player Jonas "Shaz" Suovaara. Tank player Aaron "Bischu" Kim did not sign with a team in the offseason.

Regular season

May Melee 
The Gladiators began their 2021 season on April 16, playing against the San Francisco Shock in the May Melee qualifiers. They lost their season opener against the Shock 1–3 despite taking an early lead after winning the first map. They lost their next game against the Dallas Fuel 1–3, unable to adjust to the Fuel's off-meta team compositions throughout the match.

Final roster

Standings

Game log

Regular season 

|2021 season schedule

Postseason

References 

Los Angeles Gladiators
Los Angeles Gladiators
Los Angeles Gladiators seasons